Georgios Papoulias (19 May 1927, Athens – 11 September 2009, Kolonaki) was a Greek politician and diplomat. Papoulias briefly served as the Foreign Minister of Greece on two separate terms in 1989 and 1990.

Papoulias was born on 19 May 1927. He graduated from the Law School of the University of Athens, followed by studies at the Higher School of Commerce and Army service in 1950–1951 with the rank of Second Lieutenant.  Papoulias entered the Greek Diplomatic Corps in 1955. His first foreign posting came in 1957, when he was sent to the Greek embassy in New Delhi. From there he was transferred to Bonn, where he remained until 1964 when he moved to the permanent Greek legation in Geneva. After a domestic stint as head of the Foreign Ministry's Political Affairs Department, in 1971 he became ambassador to France and Greece's Permanent Delegate to the UNESCO. Following the fall of the Greek military junta in 1974, he became Permanent Representative of Greece to the United Nations, a post he held until 1979. After that he served as ambassador in Ankara (Turkey) and, after 1983, in Washington DC.  Papoulias' first term as Foreign Minister was in the Ioannis Grivas interim government from 12 October until 23 November 1989. He was re-appointed to the foreign ministry for a second time in the Xenophon Zolotas cabinet from 16 February until 11 April 1990.

Georgios Papoulias died from an apparent suicide on September 11, 2009, at the age of 82, following serious health problems.

References

1927 births
2009 deaths
Foreign ministers of Greece
Greek diplomats
Permanent Representatives of Greece to the United Nations
Permanent Delegates of Greece to UNESCO
Ambassadors of Greece to France
Ambassadors of Greece to the United States
Ambassadors of Greece to Turkey
Suicides by firearm in Greece
Greek politicians who committed suicide
National and Kapodistrian University of Athens alumni
Athens University of Economics and Business alumni
Politicians from Athens
2009 suicides